Mahatet El Raml is a neighborhood in Alexandria, Egypt. It features a large public square containing the main station of the Alexandria tramways. It is one of the main centers for tourism, retail, and entertainment in the city.

One of the defining features of Mahatet El Raml is the specialization of vendors along certain streets (e.g. sellers of electrical and electronic equipment congregate in Nabi Danial Street). These vendors also attract tourists, helped by the presence of several hotels, including international chains such as Sofitel, restaurants, and entertainment venues. The Alexandria Opera House and Alexandria Creativity Center, venues for traditional and non-traditional performing arts respectively, are also located in the neighborhood.

See also 
 Neighborhoods in Alexandria

Populated places in Alexandria Governorate
Neighbourhoods of Alexandria